Whisper is a 2007 American horror film directed by Stewart Hendler and starring Josh Holloway, Sarah Wayne Callies, Blake Woodruff, Joel Edgerton, John Kapelos, Dulé Hill and Michael Rooker. It was written by Christopher Borrelli. The plot concerns the kidnapping of a young boy, David, who is more than he appears and brings unexpected troubles for his kidnappers.

Plot 
After being released from prison, convicted felon Max Truemont (Josh Holloway) and his fiancée Roxanne (Sarah Wayne Callies), wish to have a fresh start by running a small diner of their own. The bank refuses to loan $50,000 to them to open the business and without alternatives, Max accepts the invitation of his former partner Sydney. With his associate Vince they are to kidnap eight-year-old David (Blake Woodruff), the son of a wealthy woman in New England, under the command of a mysterious mastermind. After the successful abduction of the boy, the group awaits ransom instructions in a secluded hideout. As they begin to become suspicious of each other Max realizes the boy is not as innocent as he seems, commanding various characters to kill each other.
It's revealed that the mastermind is David's mother. She tells Max that the boy is a demon, able to "whisper" ideas to weak-minded individuals. She pleads with Max to kill the boy on her behalf. On his refusal she kills herself. Max ultimately kills David, but not before he accidentally kills Roxanne.

Cast 
 Josh Holloway  as Max Truemont
 Sarah Wayne Callies as Roxanne
 Blake Woodruff  as David
 Joel Edgerton as Vince Delayo
 John Kapelos as Whitley
 Dulé Hill as Detective Miles
 Michael Rooker as Sydney Braverman
 Teryl Rothery as Ms. Sandborn
 Cory Monteith as Teenage Guy

References

External links 
 
 
  
 

2007 films
2007 directorial debut films
2007 horror films
2000s English-language films
2000s supernatural horror films
American supernatural horror films
Films directed by Stewart Hendler
Films scored by Jeff Rona
Films set in Maine
Films shot in Vancouver
Films shot in Yukon
Gold Circle Films films
Universal Pictures films
2000s American films